Deșteptarea may refer to: 

 Deșteptarea (trade union), a trade union organization in Romania formed in 1879 
 Deșteptarea (newspaper), the newspaper of the Popular Front of Moldova (1989-1990)